Gregg Lambert (born 1961) is an American philosopher and literary theorist, who writes on Baroque and Neo-Baroque cultural history, critical theory and film, the contemporary university, and especially on the philosophers Gilles Deleuze and Jacques Derrida. Between 2008 and 2014, he was the founding director of Syracuse University Humanities Center, where he currently holds the distinguished research appointment as Dean's Professor of Humanities, and was Principal Investigator and Founding Director of the Central New York Humanities Corridor between 2008-2019.CNY Corridor

Biography 
Lambert earned a bachelor's degree in English, with a minor in Religion, from Pacific University in 1983 and an MA in English and Creative Writing from Portland State University in 1984. Between 1984 and 1987, Lambert was a Fellow in the Center for Hermeneutic Studies at the Graduate Theological Union, where he completed a Masters program in Theology and Literature, and graduate studies in French and Comparative Literature at the University of California, Berkeley. In 1995 he received a Ph.D. in Comparative Literature and Critical Theory from the University of California at Irvine under the direction of the late-French philosopher Jacques Derrida.

In 1996, Lambert joined the Department of English at Syracuse University and was later appointed as Chair between 2005 and 2008, before leaving the department to become the founding director of the Syracuse University Humanities Center. Since 2008, Lambert was also Principal Investigator of the Central New York Humanities Corridor. The CNY Humanities Corridor has been widely acknowledged as one of the most unique and successful collaborations of its kind and has served as a model for other regional consortia, such as “Humanities without Walls.” In 2013 he established the permanent endowment of the CNY Humanities Corridor over seven million dollars from a matching award by the Andrew W. Mellon Foundation,endowment announcement  and was elected as a member of the International Advisory Board of the Consortium of Humanities Centers and Institutes.

Work 
Consisting of several books and edited volumes, Lambert's published work covers a wide range of disciplines and topics, including the history of literary criticism and theory, contemporary continental philosophy, philosophy of religion, issues in the general Humanities and contemporary academic institutions. He has also published over one hundred articles in peer reviewed journals in several different fields, encyclopedias, textbooks and collected volumes. Lambert's writings have been translated into Chinese, French, Korean, Japanese, Norwegian, and other languages. Lambert is co-editor of the academic journal Deleuze and Guattari Studies (University of Edinburgh Press).

Lambert is a noted optimist about the future of the humanities. Several of his projects actively perform his main argument for the vitality of the contemporary humanities, which centers around the idea that “the academy is providing opportunities for humanities students to cope with the new paradigm of globalization”. As Co-Founder of The Perpetual Peace Project, a partnership between the European Union National Institutes of Culture (EUNIC), the International Peace Institute (IPI), the United Nations University, Slought Foundation, Syracuse University, Utrecht University, and the Treaty of Utrecht Foundation, Lambert is engaged in bringing together theorists and practitioners in revisiting 21st century prospects for international peace, on the basis of Immanuel Kant's foundational essay "Perpetual Peace: A Philosophical Sketch" (1795). He is the producer of a film by the same name, which consists of a series of short videos of several philosophers, sociologists, and diplomats speaking about peace. Lambert also served on the Advisory Board of the Histories of Violence project. His most recent book on the subject is Philosophy after Friendship: Deleuze's Conceptual Personae (University of Minnesota Press, 2017) deals with the failure of friendship in the history of political philosophy through a critical investigation of its major "conceptual personae" (Deleuze): the friend, the enemy, the stranger, the migrant, and the refugee or survivor.

Publications

Books 
2021 ‘’The World is Gone: Philosophy in Light of the Pandemic’’ .
2021 Towards a Geopolitical Image of Thought .
2021 The People are Missing: Minor Literature Today .
2020 The Elements of Foucault .
2018 Gilles Deleuze o Literature: mezi umēním, animalitou a politikou .
2017 Philosophy After Friendship: Deleuze’s Conceptual Personae, .
2016 Return Statements: The Return of Religion in Contemporary Philosophy, .
2013 Who's Afraid of Deleuze and Guattari? (Korean translation) .
2012 In Search of a New Image of Thought: Gilles Deleuze and Philosophical Expressionism, .
2008 On the (New) Baroque, .  
2006 Who’s Afraid of Deleuze and Guattari?, .  
2004 The Return of the Baroque in Modern Culture, .
2002 The Non-Philosophy of Gilles Deleuze, .
2001 Report to the Academy (re: The New Conflict of Faculties), .

Edited volumes 
2012 (with Daniel W. Smith) Deleuze: a Philosophy of the Event, . 
2006 (with Victor E. Taylor) Jean Francois Lyotard: Critical Evaluations in Cultural Theory, . 
2006 (with Aaron Levy) ‘’ Rrrevolutionnaire: Conversations in Theory, Vol. 1’’ .
2005 (with Ian Buchanan) Deleuze and Space, .

References 

1961 births
21st-century American philosophers
American literary theorists
Continental philosophers
Critical theorists
Living people
Philosophers of religion
Scholars of contemporary philosophy
Syracuse University faculty
University of California, Irvine alumni